Akbari Fort & Museum is a museum In Ajmer. It was once the residence of Prince Salīm, the son of the Emperor Akbar, and presently houses a collection of Mughal and Rajput armor and sculpture. Construction of this had been commissioned by Akbar in 1570. This is the location from where Salim, as the Emperor Jahangir read out the farmân permitting the British East India Company to trade with India.

History

Reason for Construction 
 Military - It was built for advancing mughal armies .
 Palace - It was a resting place for Emperor Akbar during his visits to Garib Nawaz in Ajmer.

See also 

 List of things named after Akbar the Great

References 

Buildings and structures in Ajmer
Museums in Rajasthan
Mughal architecture